Franz Friedrich von Sturmfeder (11 December 1758, Mannheim – 26 February 1828, Augsburg) was a German Roman Catholic priest. From 1812 to 1818 and from 1819 to 1821 he was vicar general and diocesan administrator in Augsburg - this covered the period between the fall of the Prince-Bishopric of Augsburg and the formation of the present diocese of Augsburg.

He is also notable as the uncle of Louise von Sturmfeder (1789 - 1866), tutor to Franz Joseph I of Austria and his brother Maximilian I of Mexico.

References

 

1758 births
1828 deaths
19th-century German Roman Catholic priests
18th-century German Roman Catholic priests
Clergy from Mannheim